The Latin name Abnoba Mons (Pre-Germanic Abnoba; Ancient Greek τὰ Ἄβνοβα, ta Abnoba,  Abnobaia orē) is the name of a mountain range that was already known to ancient authors Pliny and Tacitus. The name has been traditionally, primarily associated in historical research with the Black Forest. Ptolemy used the toponym in his A.D. 150 publication, Geographia, as a mountain range lying within Germania magna with its southern extent at 31° 49' and its northern extremity at 31° 52'. The geographer clearly did not restrict this name to present day Black Forest, but to an entire mountain chain.

Footnotes

Literature 
 
 Werner Heinz, Rainer Wiegels: Der Diana Abnoba Altar in Badenweiler. In: Antike Welt 13/4. 1982, S. 37–43.
  (online)
  S. ?.
 
 Corinna Scheungraber, Friedrich E. Grünzweig: Die altgermanischen Toponyme sowie ungermanische Toponyme Germaniens. Ein Handbuch zu ihrer Etymologie unter Benutzung einer Bibliographie von Robert Nedoma. Herausgegeben von Hermann Reichert. (= Philologica Germanica 34) Fassbaender, Wien 2014, S. 35–37.
 Sabine Ziegler: Bemerkungen zum keltischen Toponym Abnova/Abnoba. In: Historische Sprachforschung 116, 2, 2003, S. 290–294.

External links 
 Edition der Geographike Hyphegesis mit Übersetzung und Karte der Germania magna; retrieved, 8 February 2013
 Google Earth in der Antike. In: Der Spiegel. 39/2010, retrieved 26 February 2013

Ancient Roman geography
Black Forest
Geography of Germania